The Fragile Art of Existence is the only studio album by Control Denied, a progressive metal band founded by Chuck Schuldiner. It was released worldwide on Nuclear Blast America in 1999. Metal Mind Productions reissued the album on April 15, 2008 (February 11, 2008 in Europe). The release was digitally remastered and limited to 2,000 copies. The album was again re-released in 2010 by Relapse Records, available in two-disc and three-disc editions. The three-disc edition was limited to 1,000 copies.

This was also Chuck Schuldiner's final studio album before he died of brain cancer on December 13, 2001.

Track listing
All songs written by Chuck Schuldiner.

Credits
 Tim Aymar – vocals
 Chuck Schuldiner – lead and rhythm guitar
 Shannon Hamm – lead and rhythm guitar
 Steve DiGiorgio – bass
 Richard Christy – drums

Additional musicians
 Scott Clendenin – bass on 1996 and 1997 demos
 Chris Williams – drums on 1996 and 1997 demos
 Chuck Schuldiner – vocals on 1996 and 1999 demos

Production
 Produced by Jim Morris & Chuck Schuldiner
 Engineered, mixed & mastered by Jim Morris

External links 
 Lyrics

References 

1999 debut albums
Control Denied albums
Relapse Records albums
Albums recorded at Morrisound Recording
Albums with cover art by Travis Smith (artist)